The 2012 Nordic Opening was the 3rd edition of the annual cross-country skiing event. The three-day event was the second competition round of the 2012–13 FIS Cross-Country World Cup, after Gällivare, Sweden.

World Cup points distribution 
The winners of the overall standings were awarded 200 World Cup points and the winners of each of the three stages were awarded 50 World Cup points.

A total of 350 points was possible to achieve if one athlete won all three stages and the overall standings.

Overall standings

Overall leadership by stage

Men

Women

References

External links 
 Nordic Opening home page

2012–13 FIS Cross-Country World Cup
2012
2012 in cross-country skiing
November 2012 sports events in Europe
December 2012 sports events in Europe